Gibberula boettgeri is a species of sea snail, a marine gastropod mollusk, in the family Cystiscidae.

References

boettgeri
Gastropods described in 1884